The Glover House, also known as the Budd House, is a historic house at 50 Main Street in Newtown, Connecticut.  Built in 1869, it is a good local example of Second Empire architecture, and is further notable for the long tenancy of a single prominent local family.  It was listed on the National Register of Historic Places in 1982.

Description and history
The Glover House stands in Newtown's village center, across Main Street from Edmond Town Hall.  It is a three-story wood-frame structure, covered by a mansard roof, with its exterior walls clad in clapboards.  The main facade is three bays wide, with a central projecting bay and a full-width single-story porch.  The porch is supported by round Corinthian columns, and has a dentillated cornice.  Windows are set in segmented-arch openings on the second floor, and the third floor dormer windows are set in round-arch openings under gabled roofs.  The interior retains many period features and finishes.

The house was built in 1869 for Henry Beers Glover, and its design has been attributed to Silas Beers, who Glover new from service on a church building committee.  The house was owned by a succession of Glover descendants (whose later generations were named Budd) until 1977.  Henry Beers Glover was one of the town's richest men, a successful businessman and banker.  William Beecher, who married one of Glover's daughters, was a local attorney and judge of the probate court.  Their daughter, Florence Budd, remained in the house until her death in 1977.

See also
John Glover House, also NRHP-listed in Newtown
National Register of Historic Places listings in Fairfield County, Connecticut

References

Houses on the National Register of Historic Places in Connecticut
Second Empire architecture in Connecticut
Houses completed in 1869
Houses in Newtown, Connecticut
1869 establishments in Connecticut
National Register of Historic Places in Fairfield County, Connecticut